In mathematics, the axiom of power set is one of the Zermelo–Fraenkel axioms of axiomatic set theory.

In the formal language of the Zermelo–Fraenkel axioms, the axiom reads:

where y is the power set of x, . 

In English, this says:
Given any set x, there is a set  such that, given any set z, this set z is a member of  if and only if every element of z is also an element of x.

Note the subset relation  is not used in the formal definition as subset is not a primitive relation in formal set theory; rather, subset is defined in terms of set membership, .  By the axiom of extensionality, the set  is unique.

The axiom of power set appears in most axiomatizations of set theory. It is generally considered uncontroversial, although constructive set theory prefers a weaker version to resolve concerns about predicativity.

Consequences 

The power set axiom allows a simple definition of the Cartesian product of two sets  and :

Notice that

and, for example, considering a model using the Kuratowski ordered pair,

and thus the Cartesian product is a set since

One may define the Cartesian product of any finite collection of sets recursively:

Note that the existence of the Cartesian product can be proved without using the power set axiom, as in the case of the Kripke–Platek set theory.

Limitations 

The power set axiom does not specify what subsets of a set exist, only that there is a set containing all those that do. Not all conceivable subsets are guaranteed to exist. In particular, the power set of an infinite set would contain only "constructible sets" if the universe is the constructible universe but in other models of ZF set theory could contain sets that are not constructible.

References 

 Paul Halmos, Naive set theory. Princeton, NJ: D. Van Nostrand Company, 1960. Reprinted by Springer-Verlag, New York, 1974.  (Springer-Verlag edition).
 Jech, Thomas, 2003. Set Theory: The Third Millennium Edition, Revised and Expanded.  Springer.  .
 Kunen, Kenneth, 1980. Set Theory: An Introduction to Independence Proofs. Elsevier.  .

Axioms of set theory

de:Zermelo-Fraenkel-Mengenlehre#Die Axiome von ZF und ZFC